Hugo Tutein Nolthenius (Amsterdam, August 2, 1863 - Delft, December 12, 1944) was a Dutch industrialist and art collector.

Professional life 
Son of Julius Hendrik Tutein Nolthenius [b. 1824] and Elizabeth Maria Weymar [b. 1825], Tutein Nolthenius was born in Amsterdam on August 2, 1863. From 1878 to 1881, Tutein Nolthenius worked at the "De Atlas" factory. He became the director in 1898.

Art collecting 
Tutein Nolthenius collected art. His collection included oriental ceramics and jade, as well as artworks by Vincent van Gogh, Johan Thorn Prikker and Isaac Israëls.   He was advised by Dutch art critic H.P. Bremmer.

In 1912, he lent four Van Goghs from his collection to the Sonderbund Exhibition in Cologne.

Family 
He had a brother, Jacques Tutein Nolthenius and a nephew, William, who inherited parts of his collection.

References

External links 

 Hugo Tutein Nolthenius (1863-1944). Portret van een 'Delftsch' kunstverzamelaar
 Delftse Post Een Delftenaar met allure: Herinneringen aan Hugo Tutein Nolthenius, De Weekkrant

[[Category:Dutch businesspeople]]
[[Category:Dutch art collectors]]

Dutch businesspeople
Dutch art collectors
1863 births
1944 deaths